Andrew John Chenge (born 24 December 1947) is a Tanzanian CCM politician and Former Member of Parliament for Bariadi West constituency from 2005 to 2020.

Background
After serving as Attorney-General, he was appointed as Minister of East African Affairs in the Cabinet named on January 4, 2006.  He was then appointed as Minister of Infrastructure on October 15, 2006, retaining that post in the Cabinet named on February 12, 2008. He resigned on 20 April 2008 after it was revealed by UK's Serious Fraud Office that he holds US$ 1million (over 1 billion Tanzania shillings) in an overseas offshore account, allegedly as kickbacks from a controversial military radar deal between UK's BAE Systems and Tanzania government which he partly oversaw while serving as Attorney-General. However, an investigation by Tanzania's Prevention and Combating of Corruption Bureau concluded that Chenge was not related to the radar scam.  

In 2009, Andrew Chenge was involved in an accident in Dar es Salaam in which two women died. He was later convicted of dangerous driving and fined 700,000 Tsh.

He was reelected in November 2015 as a parliamentary representative for the Bariadi West Constituency. He has also been appointed as the presiding Chairman of Parliament as of January 2015.

References

External links
Chenge case not yet closed, says UK, 11 November 2010
BAE plea deal in danger of collapse, 20 December 2010

1947 births
Living people
Chama Cha Mapinduzi MPs
Tanzanian MPs 2005–2010
Tanzanian MPs 2010–2015
Attorneys General of Tanzania
Mkwawa Secondary School alumni
University of Dar es Salaam alumni
Harvard Law School alumni